Penfield is an unincorporated census-designated place in Compromise Township, Champaign County, Illinois, United States. Its population was 151 at the 2020 census.

History
Penfield was laid out in 1876 and is named after John Penfield of Rantoul, Illinois. Along with nearby Gifford, it had a station on the now-defunct Illinois Central Railroad.

Geography

Demographics
As of the 2020 census there were 151 people, 104 households, and 57 families residing in the CDP. The racial makeup of the CDP was 90.07% White, 1.32% from other races, and 8.61% from two or more races. Hispanic or Latino of any race were 2.65% of the population.

There were 104 households, out of which 9.62% had children under the age of 18 living with them, 51.92% were married couples living together, 0.00% had a female householder with no husband present, and 45.19% were non-families. 23.08% of all households were made up of individuals, and 16.35% had someone living alone who was 65 years of age or older. The average household size was 2.05 and the average family size was 2.26.

The CDP's age distribution consisted of 21.3% under the age of 18, 4.3% from 18 to 24, 18.7% from 25 to 44, 14.5% from 45 to 64, and 41.3% who were 65 years of age or older. The median age was 48.0 years. For every 100 females, there were 108.0 males. For every 100 females age 18 and over, there were 103.3 males.

The median income for a household in the CDP was $76,250, and the median income for a family was $118,164. Males had a median income of $48,750 versus $31,136 for females. The per capita income for the CDP was $33,539. No of families and 7.2% of the population were below the poverty line, including none of those under age 18 and none of those age 65 or over.

References

Bibliography 
 

Census-designated places in Champaign County, Illinois
Census-designated places in Illinois